Sampat Singh (born 20 April 1949) is a former Finance Minister of Haryana, India. As a Janata Party candidate, he was elected to the Haryana Legislative Assembly from the Bhattu Kalan constituency in 1982 and has been re-elected on five occasions. He was leader of the opposition from 1991 to 1996. His six election successes made him the most senior Indian National Congress legislator in 12th Haryana assembly. He has held many important portfolios in state government as minister.

Personal life
Sampat Singh was born in the village of Bhattu Kalan, Fatehabad District, Haryana, on 20 April 1949. His father was Ram Chander.Educated in the village and at Hisar, he holds MA and B.Ed. degrees. He is married to Krishna Singh and has two children.

Singh was a lecturer in political science at Dayanand College, Hisar for five years from 1972. He has been jailed several times, including in 1972-73 and 1983, while campaigning for various causes.

Career

State politics
Singh has been elected to the Haryana Legislative Assembly in 1982, 1987, 1991, 1998, 2000 and 2009.

Singh was appointed at political secretary to Devi Lal in 1977 and held the post for two years. At this point, Devi Lal headed the Janata Party. Singh stood unsuccessfully in the Bhattu Kalan constituency by-election of 1980, claiming afterwards that he lost "because of widespread use of unfair means". He won the seat in the 1982 state assembly elections.

Between 1991-1996, Singh was Leader of the Opposition in the state assembly.

Heeding views of his close supporters, Singh quit the Indian National Lok Dal (INLD) on 14 July 2009 and held a meeting with his supporters and workers on 18 July 2009 in Hisar. He described the INLD as being in "complete disarray", no longer aligned with the principles of Devi Lal and subject to the nepotism of its then leader, Om Prakash Chautala. After ending his 32-year association with it, he joined the Indian National Congress (INC) on 27 July 2009.

The INC selected Singh as their candidate for the Nalwa constituency in Hisar. He then won the seat in the 2009 elections by defeating the sitting member, Jasma Devi of the HJC.

National politics
As an INLD politician, Singh contested the 2009 Indian general election from Hisar Lok Sabha constituency on a National Democratic Alliance ticket. He lost narrowly to former chief minister Bhajan Lal.

Singh stood as an INC candidate for a seat in the national parliament in the 2014 Indian general election. He finished in third place in the Hisar Lok Sabha constituency.

Political career
 1977- 1979: Political Secretary to Devi Lal, Chief Minister of Haryana
 1980: election conveyor for Devi Lal during 7th Lok Sabha elections
 1980: contested by-election from Bhattu Kalan
 1981: State Youth Party President until 1984, when he resigned at the age of 35 to make way for other youth members
 1982: elected to 6th Vidhan Sabha from Bhattu Kalan constituency. Member of the Scheduled Caste and Welfare Society of Haryana Vidhan Sabha
 1984: District Party President, Hisar until 1987
 1987: elected to 7th Vidhan Sabha, Bhattu Kalan constituency, Minister of Industry, Excise & Taxation, Town & Country Planning, Home, Local Bodies, Jails, Public Relations, Irrigation & Power, Finance, Parliamentary Affairs & Planning
 1991: elected to 8th Vidhan Sabha, Bhattu Kalan constituency, Leader of Opposition, Haryana
 1996: contested election from Bhattu Kalan
 1998: elected to 9th Vidhan Sabha, Fatehabad constituency, Chairman, Assurance Committee, Haryana Vidhan Sabha
 1999: Cabinet Minister for Finance, Parliamentary Affairs & Planning
 2000: elected to 10th Vidhan Sabha, Bhattu Kalan constituency, Cabinet Minister for Finance, Parliamentary Affairs & Planning
 2005: contested election from Bhattu Kalan
 2008: by-election contested in Adampur

Positions held
President, District Lok Dal, Hisar ;
Member State Lok Dal Executive
Member, Haryana Sangharsh Samiti
President, Haryana State Yuva Lok Dal
National General Secretary, Samajwadi Janata Party

References

1949 births
Living people
Janata Party politicians
Indian National Lok Dal politicians
Indian National Congress politicians
People from Hisar district
People from Fatehabad district
State cabinet ministers of Haryana
Leaders of the Opposition in Haryana